Ñeembucú (Guaraní: Ñe'ẽmbuku) is a department located in the south of the Eastern Region of Paraguay. The capital is Pilar.  The department is almost entirely rural, and is home to some of the oldest and best-preserved Jesuit ruins, which are located near the town of Humaitá.

Districts

The department is divided in 16 districts:

 Alberdi
 Cerrito
 Desmochados
 General José Eduvigis Díaz
 Guazú Cuá
 Humaitá
 Isla Umbú
 Laureles
 Mayor José J. Martinez
 Paso de Patria
 Pilar
 San Juan Bautista del Ñeembucú
 Tacuaras
 Villa Franca
 Villa Oliva
 Villalbín

Land
The terrain in Ñeembucú is markedly flat, covered mostly in flat, grassy fields only broken by the occasional wetland swamp or green "monte". Montes, despite their name, are not mountains at all, but patches of dense trees and brush that provide shade to the cattle who graze on the flat plains surrounding them. Almost all of the land in Ñeembucú is used for grazing (cattle, sheep) or other types of agriculture.

Borders
To the west, Ñeembucú is limited by the Rio Paraguay and Argentina, to the south by the Rio Paraná and Argentina, to the north by the Central department, and to the east by the departments of Paraguarí and Misiones.

History
Ñeembucú was the theatre of the second phase of the War of the Triple Alliance.  Battles fought there included Tuyutí, Curupaytí, the Boquerón del Sauce and Humaitá.

See also
 List of high schools in Ñeembucú

References

External links

http://misionesparaguay.com/Cerrito.html